Alex Lloyd is the fourth studio album by Alex Lloyd, released in October 2005 (see 2005 in music). The album peaked at number 7 on the ARIA Charts. The album was recorded in London Bridge Studios, Seattle, with famed producer Rick Parashar.

Track listing
All tracks written by Alex Lloyd (credited as A. Wasiliev)
 "Brand New Day" – 4:08
 "Outside" – 3:31
 "Never Meant to Fail" – 3:48
 "All You Need" – 3:03
 "Still Waiting" – 3:26
 "Sometimes" – 4:18
 "The Wonder" – 4:14
 "Holding On" – 3:44
 "I Wish" – 3:18
 "Follow" – 3:16
 "Stand Down" – 3:27
 "Speeding Cars" – 3:36

Charts

Certification

References

2005 albums
Albums produced by Rick Parashar
Alex Lloyd albums